Joseph Calata (born July 31, 1980) is a Filipino businessman.  He served as the Chairman and Chief Executive Officer of Calata Corporation, a company formerly listed on the Philippine Stock Exchange. At the age of 31, he became the youngest Chairman of a publicly listed company in the country. He is also thought as the youngest self-made billionaire in the Philippines.

Early years

Joseph Calata was born and raised in Plaridel, Bulacan He is the second son of four siblings of Eusebio and Isabel. His parents were middle-income business folks contented in running their small retail store. He attended a Catholic school for boys in Bulacan before taking up a business course at the De La Salle University.

At the age of 17, he turned his 100 USD capital into 10,000 USD in a span of 6 months by selling health supplements. 

In 2001, shortly after graduating with a degree of Bachelor of Science in Commerce, majoring in management of financial institutions, Joseph opted to manage their small mom-and-pop store with a vision to grow the business and provide innovations in the agricultural industry.

During his early leadership, he introduced computerized innovations to the business, such as adding accounting and inventory systems. Through his efforts and aggressiveness, the company added more retail branches and became the largest distributor of agricultural products such as fertilizers, seeds, chemicals, and veterinary medicine in the country.

At the age of 31, he became the youngest Chairman and CEO of a publicly listed company in the history of the Philippine Stock Exchange when Calata Corporation (CAL) had its Initial Public Offering in 2012 with a staggering value of P2.7 billion. CAL was among the few select 200 companies that were able to list in the highly exclusive PSE. 

Joseph was regarded as the youngest self-made billionaire in the country.

Calata Corporation

The simple poultry retail store has become one of the giants in the agricultural industry. From purchasing its first company computer in 2001 to hiring their first salesman in 2002, the company's revenue grew to PHP 200 million in 2003. It was in 2006 when the company achieved its first billion in sales. In 2012, the company's revenue rose to as high as PHP2.2 billion paving the way for Calata Corporation to gain entry to the Philippine Stock Exchange.

During the company's initial public offering on May 23, 2012, Calata Corporation's market capitalization was PHP 2.7 billion. Calata Corp's stock price started at PHP 7.50 per share that day and even rose to PHP 23.95 per share. 

In 2012, Calata Corporation has become the best-performing IPO on the Philippine Stock Exchange. IPO yielded returns of up to 220% in a span of a few months.

Recognition

Joseph Calata is cited as one of the 100 MOST POWERFUL AND INFLUENTIAL FILIPINOS of 2012 according to BizNews Asia Magazine. He was the youngest on the list. 

In 2015, he was declared one of the winners of the NEXT GENERATION GLOBAL FRANCHISE LEADER award held at the International Franchise Association Franchise Convention, USA. (2015) 

He was given the EXEMPLARY MEN OF INFLUENCE recognition by the Philippine Cancer Society in 2012. 

On Nov 8, 2015, Calata Corporation achieved a Guinness World Record for the largest serving of roast pork beating Mexico's record. Held at the Liwasang Aurora, Quezon City Memorial Circle, this event also served as a celebratory feast and an early Christmas treat for the less privileged residents of Metro Manila, as part of the company's 16th anniversary. This event was also the launching of a new business segment of Calata Corporation's meat business.

In 2017, he was among the panel of investors in History Channel’s THE FINAL PITCH SEASON 1.
A reality TV show featuring entrepreneurs presenting their business pitch to a panel of investors for funding. 

He was also one of the AWARDEES in MEN WHO MATTER given by Stargate People Asia Magazine (2017)

Philanthropy works
Some of the beneficiaries of his corporate social responsibility work include Gawad Kalinga, Child Protection Network, Fashion Watch, Empowering Brilliant Minds Foundation, Red Cross, Haribon Foundation, and the NBI Foundation. 

He donated P2 million in his personal capacity to his alma mater, De La Salle University for its AGSI (Agrivet Science Institute) scholarship fund.

References

 Filipino chief executives
1980 births
 Living people
 People from Bulacan
 De La Salle University alumni